

Seedings
The seedings were announced on 23 June 2015.

Draw
The draw was held on 26 June 2015. The teams played a semifinal and final to determine the last participants. Matches were played on 12 and 13 September 2016.

Qualification tournament 1
Glassverket IF organized the tournament.

Bracket

All times are local (UTC+2).

Semifinals

Third place game

Final

Qualification tournament 2
HCM Baia Mare organized the tournament.

Bracket

All times are local (UTC+3).

Semifinals

Third place game

Final

References

External links
Official website

Qualifying